Telangana Super Thermal Power Project(TSTPP) is in Telangana, India. The power plant is under construction with power capacity of 1600 MW (2x800 MW) in first phase and in total planned capacity of 4000 MW. It is the coal based power plant of National Thermal Power Corporation. It is being built near Ramagundam village in Karimnagar District.

Capacity 
The first unit of 800MW is expected to be completed by May 2020 and the next would follow in six months.

References

External links 

Executive Summary of Draft
Zero date started for TSTPS

Khammam district
Coal-fired power stations in Telangana
2020 establishments in Telangana